Nantou may refer to:

 Nantou County (南投縣), a county in central Taiwan (Republic of China)
 Nantou City (南投市), seat of Nantou County, Taiwan
 Nantou (historical town) (南头), a historic town and former administrative center of Xin'an County, in Nanshan, Shenzhen, China
 Nantou, Zhongshan (南头镇), town under the jurisdiction of Zhongshan, Guangdong Province, China